Nemapogon ophrionella is a moth of the family Tineidae. It is found in North America, where it has been recorded from Maine, Quebec and Texas.

References

Moths described in 1905
Nemapogoninae